John James Borger Jr. better known by his stage name Borgeous (stylized as BORGEOUS), is an American DJ and music producer.

Career
The LA-based Platinum recording artist and DJ/producer has already accomplished three Billboard Dance Radio Top 10s, three Beatport #1's and a #1 on the iTunes Dancechart in 15 different countries.

His earlier releases include "From Cali With Love", "GANGSTEROUS", "Rags to Riches" and "AGGRO" that launched his career in 2013. However it was with the release of "Tsunami" in collaboration with Canadian electronic music duo DVBBS that he shot to international fame. At first there was confusion about the actual creator of the track. The single had been a big hit at festivals for months and occasionally been attributed to DJ Sander van Doorn, but was confirmed by Pete Tong to be the work of DVBBS and Borgeous. In its world exclusive, Tong played the song on his show on BBC Radio 1 on August 16, 2013. Billboard magazine called it “the most played tune at Tomorrowland,” the 2013 Belgian electronic music festival. It was officially released on Doorn Records on August 19, 2013. A week later, it reached #1 on the Beatport 100. It reached #1 on iTunes in 15 different countries, #1 on Beatport, received an EMPO Award for ‘Track of the Year’ and was nominated for the Juno Award ‘Best Dance Recording of the Year’.

On 15 October 2013, he was signed by Spinnin' Records.

In 2014, he reached the top 10 on Billboard's Dance Radio chart not just once, but twice with “Invincible” and “Wildfire”. “Invincible” also became the #2 Song of 2014 on SiriusXM's BPM Radio and Wildfire was #14. He was recruited to remake Afrojack's lead single featuring Wrabel, "Ten Feet Tall" for Universal Music as well as Ariana Grande's "One Last Time". It was in this year that SiriusXM gave him a residency on his weekly podcast “House of Borgeous”. He was also ranked in DJ Mag's 2013 Top 100 DJs at #87.

Discography

Studio albums

Extended plays

Singles

Remixes

2013 
 Ciara – "Goodies"

2014 
 Havana Brown – "Warrior"
 Afrojack featuring Wrabel – "Ten Feet Tall"
 Dirty Heads – "My Sweet Summer"
 Lights – "Up We Go"

2015 
 K Theory – "Night Lights"
 Morgan Page featuring The Oddictions & Britt Daley – "Running Wild"
 Ariana Grande – "One Last Time"

2016 
 Icona Pop – "Brightside"
 Dirty Heads – "Oxygen"

2018 
 Marshmello and Anne-Marie - "Friends"
 Why Don't We - "Hooked"

References

External links
Official website

American DJs
Record producers from Florida
Living people
Musicians from Miami
Spinnin' Records artists
Progressive house musicians
Future house musicians
Electronic dance music DJs
Year of birth missing (living people)